Statistics of the Turkish First Football League for the 1975–76 season.

Overview
Sixteen teams participated, and Trabzonspor won the championship, becoming the first team outside of Istanbul to win the league title.

League table

Results

References
 Turkey - List of final tables (RSSSF)

Süper Lig seasons
1975–76 in Turkish football
Turkey